Elangadu is an Indian village situated on the banks of the river Cauvery. It is about 12 kilometers from Kallanai, the Grand Anicut. It is surrounded by irrigation canals. Ilankaadu, in Thanjavur district, is nearby. In this village,

Economy 
Agriculture is the main occupation in this area. Paddy cultivation is a common occupation along with rice, coconut, banana and sugar cane

Education 
Students are taught in Tamil.

History 
The residents' passion for Tamil and their desire to become teachers dates to 1881 when ‘Nattramizh Sangam’ was established at the village.

Tamil scholar Pandithurai Devar arrived at Ilankaadu for the inauguration of the Sangam that year. and Tamil has been taught since. Until 2005, Tamil classes and speeches were held every evening. Scholars including UV Saminatha Iyer, Maraimalai Adigal, Somasundara Barathiyar, and many others spoke there.

Notables 

 G Nammalvar. 
 Tiruchi Siva. 
 G Murugaiyan Sethurar 
 G Ilangovan Papurettiyar.

Demographics 
At the 2018 census, Elangadu had a total population of around 1600 with 790 males and 810 females. The sex ratio was 10:20 and the literacy rate was 77.11%.

Culture 
Temples:
 Sree Valavaneeshwar temple, Athankaatha ayyanar.
 Shri Throwpathi amman temple
 Sri Kannan Temple
 Shri Saptha Kannimar temple
Every year in May and June, the Thiruvizha festival is performed in the Thurowpathi Amman Temple.

References 
 

Villages in Thanjavur district